Equality Arizona is a statewide political advocacy organization in Arizona that advocates for lesbian, gay, bisexual, and transgender (LGBT) rights, including same-sex marriage.

History 
Equality Arizona was formed in 1992 as the Arizona Human Rights Fund after the Phoenix City Council rejected a non-discrimination ordinance to extend protections to gays and lesbians.

Structure 
Equality Arizona is a 501(c)(3) nonprofit organization working on charitable, scientific, and educational efforts to promote LGBT issues.

Equality Arizona Advocacy Fund is a 501(c)(4) nonprofit organization that engages in lobbying on LGBT policy matters.

Equality Arizona Advocacy Fund PAC is a political action committee that endorses and support candidates for political office who support LGBT issues.

Activities 
Equality Arizona engages in political lobbying on LGBT issues, helping LGBT supportive candidates get elected into public office, educating the public on LGBT issues, and providing support to members of the LGBT community.

The organization is a member of the Equality Federation.

See also 

 LGBT rights in Arizona
 List of LGBT rights organizations
 Same-sex marriage in Arizona

References

External links 
 

1992 establishments in Arizona
Equality Federation
LGBT political advocacy groups in Arizona
Non-profit organizations based in Arizona
Organizations based in Phoenix, Arizona
Organizations established in 1992